Achille Esther (born 24 May 2002) is a Seychellois footballer who plays as a defender for Seychelles First Division club La Passe FC and the Seychelles national team.

Club career
In November 2019, while a member of La Passe FC of the Seychelles First Division, Esther traveled to Germany for a two-week training stint with VfL Lohbrügge of the Landesliga Hamburg-Hansa. He was joined on the trip by twin brothers, Assad and Affandi Aboudou.

International career
Esther made his senior international debut on 1 September 2021 in a friendly against Comoros.

International career statistics

References

External links

2002 births
Living people
Association football midfielders
Seychellois footballers
Seychelles international footballers
La Passe FC players